Mosh Pit On Disney is a Japanese compilation cover album containing punk rock and ska renditions of various Disney songs, such as Mickey Mouse Club March, Main Street Electrical Parade, and Under the Sea, performed by both Japanese and American artists.

Track listing

 Mosh Pit Steamroller, You Are!!! — Disney
 Mickey Mouse Club March — Andrew W.K.
 A Whole New World — Low IQ 01
 Colors Of The Wind — Acidman
 Give A Little Whistle — The Band Apart
 You Can Fly! You Can Fly! You Can Fly! — Wrench
 Hi-Diddle-Dee-Dee — Monteroza 4950
 Winnie The Pooh — Asparagus
 It's Not Easy — Reel Big Fish
 Age Of Not Believing — The Miceteeth
 Can't Help Falling In Love — Oi-Skall Mates
 Heigh-Ho — The Vandals
 Main Street Electrical Parade — Kenzi Masabuchi
 When You Wish Upon A Star — American Hi-Fi
 Give A Little Whistle — Toru Hidaka (Beat Crusaders)
 I'll Try — TGMX
 Under The Sea — Doping Panda
 Ev'rybody Wants To Be A Cat — Brian Setzer
 Heartbreak Hotel — Sexer
 I Wanna Be Like You — Smash Mouth
 Good Company — Cubismo Grafico Five
 Under The Sea — Your Song Is Good
 Some Day My Prince Will Come — Full Swing
 Part Of Your World  — The Suemith

2004 albums
Avex Group compilation albums
Covers albums
Walt Disney Records compilation albums